Lewis Campbell (1830–1908) was a Scottish classical scholar.

Biography
Campbell was born in Edinburgh. His father, Robert Campbell, RN, was a first cousin of Thomas Campbell, the poet. His mother was the author Eliza Constantia Campbell. His father died when he was two years of age. In 1844 his mother married Colonel Morrieson.

Campbell was educated at Edinburgh Academy, the University of Glasgow, Trinity College, Oxford and Balliol College, Oxford. He was fellow and tutor of Queen's College, Oxford (1855–1858), vicar of Milford, Hampshire (1858–1863), and professor of Greek at the University of St Andrews (1863–1894). An advocate for the higher education for women, he was closely involved in the foundation of St Leonards School for Girls and was the chairman of the school council from 1886-1903. In 1894, he was elected an honorary fellow of Balliol College, Oxford. From 1894 to 1896 at St Andrews, he gave the Gifford Lectures, which were published in 1898.

Although an Anglican vicar,  in October 1893 Campbell  was reportedly preaching at the University of St Andrews' College Church, a Church of Scotland foundation.

Works
As a scholar he is best known by his work on Sophocles and Plato. His published works include:
Sophocles Greek text with English notes in two volumes (2nd ed., 1879)
The Sophistes and Politicus of Plato Greek text with English notes (1867)
 Sophocles, The Seven Plays in English Verse (1883)
The Theaetetus of Plato Greek text with English notes (2nd ed., 1883)
Republic, the Greek text, in three volumes (with Benjamin Jowett, 1894)
Life and Letters of Benjamin Jowett in two volumes (with Evelyn Abbott, 1897)
Letters of B. Jowett (1899)
Life of James Clerk Maxwell, with William Garnett, 1st ed., 1882, (new ed. revised and abridged, 1884)
A Guide to Greek Tragedy for English Readers (1891)
  (Gifford Lectures for 1894-1896)
On the Nationalisation of the Old English Universities (1901)
Verse translations of the plays of Aeschylus (1890)
Sophocles (1896)
Plato's Republic Oxford lectures (1902)
Tragic Drama in Aeschylus, Sophocles and Shakespeare (1904)
Paralipomena Sophoclea (1907).

Sir W.D. Ross had recognized the importance of stylometric methods in Plato chronology which Campbell had introduced in his editions of the Sophistes and Politicus of 1869. Recent scholars such as Charles H. Kahn and Diskin Clay, have each advanced the ordering and grouping of Plato's dialogues according to the same method.

Notes

References

External links

Lewis Campbell biographical notes and Lectures available from the Gifford Lectures website
 
 
 

1830 births
1908 deaths
19th-century Scottish people
Academics from Edinburgh
People educated at Edinburgh Academy
Alumni of the University of Glasgow
Alumni of Trinity College, Oxford
Alumni of Balliol College, Oxford
Academics of the University of St Andrews
Fellows of The Queen's College, Oxford
Fellows of Balliol College, Oxford
Scottish biographers
Scottish classical scholars
Scottish translators
Scottish literary critics
19th-century British translators
Writers from Edinburgh